John H. "Jack" Corcoran (May 15, 1858 – December 28, 1935), was an American catcher in Major League Baseball who played for the Brooklyn Atlantics during the  season.  This was his only season in the Majors. He did play professional baseball in various minor and independent leagues from 1882–1899.

References

External links

 

1858 births
1935 deaths
Brooklyn Atlantics (AA) players
Major League Baseball catchers
Baseball players from Massachusetts
Sportspeople from Lowell, Massachusetts
19th-century baseball players
Philadelphia Phillies (minor league) players
Camden Merritts players
Brooklyn Grays (Interstate Association) players
Richmond Virginians (minor league) players
Jersey City Jerseys players
Jersey City Skeeters players
Newark Little Giants players
New Haven (minor league baseball) players
Wilmington Blue Hens players
Lynn (minor league baseball) players
Saginaw Alerts players
Brockton Shoemakers players
Jackson Wolverines players
Waterbury Rough Riders players